Jean-Paul Coche (born 25 July 1947) is a French former judoka who competed in the 1972 Summer Olympics and in the 1976 Summer Olympics.

References

External links
 

1947 births
Living people
Sportspeople from Nice
French male judoka
Olympic judoka of France
Judoka at the 1972 Summer Olympics
Judoka at the 1976 Summer Olympics
Olympic bronze medalists for France
Olympic medalists in judo
Medalists at the 1972 Summer Olympics
20th-century French people